Olofsson is a Swedish patronymic surname meaning "son of Olof". The surname Olsson is a contraction of Olofsson. Notable people with the surname include:

 Anna Carin Olofsson (born 1973), biathlete 
 Clark Olofsson (born 1947), criminal
 Eva Olofsson (born 1952), Left Party politician, member of the parliament
 Fredrik Olofsson (born 1996), Swedish ice hockey player
 Gustav Olofsson (born 1994), Swedish ice hockey player
 Ingjald Olofsson, mythical king of Värmland
 Johan Olofsson (born 1976), snowboarder
 Kjell Olofsson (born 1965), former footballer.
 Linda Olofsson (born 1972), former freestyle swimmer
 Linda Olofsson (born 1973), TV-journalist
 Mats Olofsson (born 1945), Swedish curler
 Maud Olofsson (born 1955), Centre Party politician, Minister for Enterprise and Energy
 Niclas Olofsson (born 1975), former floorball player
 Pale Olofsson (born 1947), rock musician, actor
 Peter Olofsson (born 1957), former handball player 
 Placid Olofsson (1916 - 2017), Hungarian Benedictine monk, priest, teacher and Gulag victim
 Sverker Olofsson (born 1947), TV-personality
 Simon Olofsson, Swedish curler
 Victor Olofsson (born 1995), Swedish ice hockey player

See also
 8697 Olofsson, a main-belt asteroid
 Olsson
 Olson (surname)

Patronymic surnames
Swedish-language surnames
Surnames from given names